Julia Has Two Lovers is a 1991 romantic comedy-drama about a woman who takes up with a mysterious stranger after she grows tired of her current boyfriend. The film was directed by Bashar Shbib, and stars Daphna Kastner, David Duchovny and David Charles.

External links 
 
 

1991 films
Canadian romantic comedy-drama films
English-language Canadian films
1990s romantic comedy-drama films
Films directed by Bashar Shbib
American romantic comedy-drama films
1991 comedy films
1991 drama films
C/FP Distribution films
1990s English-language films
1990s American films
1990s Canadian films